The Onuphidae are a family of polychaete worms.

Characteristics
Most onuphids have tubes. Some live semisubmerged in the substrate, but others carry their tubes around, and they can all rebuild their tubes if necessary. The tubes, thin and parchment-like, are formed of bits of shell and sand, with plant debris, stuck together with mucus. The onuphids are all omnivorous scavengers, feeding on animal and vegetable debris.

The prostomium has two short frontal antennae, two globular palps and five main antennae. The mandibles are large and the maxillae have several pairs of plates edged with fine teeth. Some tentacular cirri are present. The anterior parapodium points forward and has tapered ventral cirri. The posterior parapodium has cushion-like cirri. The setae include winged capillaries and pseudocompound forms on the anterior parapodia and winged capillaries, comb-setae and acicular setae on the posterior ones.

Genera
The World Register of Marine Species includes these genera in the family:
Americonuphis Fauchald, 1973
Anchinothria Paxton, 1986
Aponuphis Kucheruk, 1978
Australonuphis Paxton, 1986
Brevibrachium Paxton, 1986
Diopatra Audouin & Milne Edwards, 1833
Dualgenys †
Epidiopatra Augener, 1918
Fauchaldonuphis Paxton, 2005
Hartmanonuphis Paxton, 1986
Heptaceras Ehlers, 1868
Hirsutonuphis Paxton, 1986
Hyalinoecia Malmgren, 1867
Hyalospinifera Kucheruk, 1979
Kinbergonuphis Fauchald, 1982
Leptoecia Chamberlin, 1919
Longibrachium Paxton, 1986
Mooreonuphis Fauchald, 1982
Neonuphis
Nothria Malmgren, 1866
Notonuphis Kucheruk, 1978
Onuphis Audouin & Milne Edwards, 1833
Paradiopatra Ehlers, 1887
Parahyalinoecia
Paranorthia
Paraonuphis
Parhyalinoecia
Paronuphis Ehlers, 1887
Paxtonia Budaeva & Fauchald, 2011
Protodiopatra Budaeva & Fauchald, 2011
Rhamphobrachium Ehlers, 1887

References

Polychaetes